This is a listing of the horses that finished in either first, second, or third place and the number of starters in the Ben's Cat Stakes (1983-2017), an American Thoroughbred Stakes race for fillies and mares three years-old and up at one mile ( furlongs) run on turf at Laurel Park Racecourse in Laurel, Maryland.

References

 The Dahlia Stakes at Pedigree Query

Lists of horse racing results
Laurel Park Racecourse